WMKB (102.9 FM) is a radio station licensed to Earlville, Illinois, United States, covering Mendota,  La Salle, Amboy, and vicinity in Northern Illinois.  WMKB airs a Mexican talk and Oldies format and is owned by KM Radio.

History
WMKB began broadcasting February 3, 2003, and originally aired a classic rock format. On January 2, 2012, the station adopted a regional Mexican format branded "102.9 Mex Mix". During a severe thunderstorm in mid-November, 2020, WMKB broadcast "dead air", that is, no audio was heard, likely related to the storm. The station remained in that state until April 1, 2021, when the transmitter went off the air. In early 2022, the station briefly returned to the air broadcasting NowMedia network programming, which includes Spanish News/Talk, and aired music programming with an oldies format overnight, however the station spent the remainder of 2022 broadcasting silence. On January 10, 2023, the station resumed a normal broadcast schedule. The FCC extended their license to broadcast through December 1, 2028.

References

External links

Regional Mexican radio stations in the United States
MKB
Radio stations established in 2003
2003 establishments in Illinois